L'Intermédiaire des mathématiciens was a peer-reviewed scientific journal covering mathematics published by Gauthier-Villars et fils. It was established in 1894 by Émile Lemoine and Charles-Ange Laisant and was published until 1920. A second series started in 1922 and was published until 1925.

External links 
L'Intermédiaire des mathématiciens at the HathiTrust Digital Library

Publications established in 1894
Publications disestablished in 1925
Mathematics journals
French-language journals